Llamayuq (Quechua llama llama, -yuq a suffix, "the one with a llama (or llamas)", also spelled Llamayoq) is an archaeological site with tombs and rock paintings in Peru. It is situated in the Cusco Region, Calca Province, Calca District.

References 

Rock art in South America
Archaeological sites in Peru
Archaeological sites in Cusco Region
Tombs in Peru